Stephen Carl Lentz (born November 6, 1978) is an American former pastor, notable for being a celebrity pastor, spiritual advisor to celebrities such as Justin Bieber, Kendall Jenner, and Selena Gomez and categorized as a hype-priest by GQ. He was the lead pastor of Hillsong NYC until November 4, 2020, when he was fired by Hillsong Global Pastor Brian Houston for "leadership issues and breaches of trust, plus a recent revelation of moral failures." On May 31, 2021, the former nanny of Lentz's children accused him of bullying, abuse of power, and sexual abuse.

Early life and education
Carl Lentz was born in Williamsburg, Virginia. From 1998 to 2000, he attended North Carolina State University and was a walk-on basketball player on the school's men's basketball team. As an adult, he moved to Los Angeles to study at The King's College and Seminary. He then went on to study at Hillsong International Leadership College of Hillsong Church in Sydney, Australia. It was during his studies, at the age of 20, that he and Joel Houston, Hillsong founder Brian Houston's son, had the idea to plant a campus of Hillsong Church in New York City. He graduated in theology in 2003 and returned to Virginia Beach. He then became a youth pastor after being ordained.

Ministry
In 2010, Lentz co-founded Hillsong NYC in New York City and radically changed and impacted church and ministries especially amongst the unchurched age group - millennials. Lentz even started the fashion and  branding trend amongst younger pastors such as tattoos, hair style, clothing and footwear.

Lentz baptized Justin Bieber, was present at the baptism of Kevin Durant, and has befriended various other well-known people.

On October 30, 2017, while on The View, Lentz was asked if he believed abortion was a sin; he did not answer the question directly, instead saying that "the cultural, religious norm right now is that if you and I disagree, we're done. I don't believe that's the case." Eight days later, Lentz released a statement via Twitter saying "I do believe abortion is sinful." In January 2019 he called the passage of the Reproductive Health Act in the State of New York, which allows abortion after 24 weeks when a fetus is unviable or the pregnancy poses a risk to the mother's health, "evil, shameful and demonic".

Lentz appeared on Oprah's SuperSoul Sunday which caused controversy with Christians due to the question asked of can one have a relationship with God outside of Jesus.

Scandals

Affair and dismissal 
On November 4, 2020, Brian Houston, Global Senior Pastor of Hillsong announced through a church newsletter that he had fired Lentz. The reason for Lentz's removal was cited as "leadership issues and breaches of trust, plus a recent revelation of moral failures." Lentz acknowledged that he had engaged in an adulterous affair. His wife's employment with the church was also terminated despite her own conduct not being an issue.

Sexual assault allegation
On May 31, 2021, Leona Kimes accused Carl of "manipulation, control, bullying, abuse of power, and sexual abuse" toward her. Kimes worked as the Lentz family nanny and alleges that the assaults happened from 2011 to 2017.

Published works 
 Own the Moment (Simon & Schuster, 2017)

References

External links
 

1978 births
American Pentecostal pastors
American Christian writers
American evangelicals
American expatriates in Australia
Hillsong Church
Living people
NC State Wolfpack men's basketball players
American men's basketball players
Adultery in evangelical Christianity